Bertholda (minor planet designation: 420 Bertholda) is a very large main-belt asteroid. It was discovered by Max Wolf on September 7, 1896, in Heidelberg, Germany. The object is part of the Cybele asteroid group, and is classified as a P-type asteroid.

References

External links
 
 

Cybele asteroids
Bertholda
Bertholda
P-type asteroids (Tholen)
18960907